Allagash is a town in Aroostook County, Maine. It is on the Allagash River in the North Maine Woods region.

The population was 237 at the 2020 census.

Geography
This makes Allagash the largest town in Maine in terms of total land area (although when both land and water areas are included in the total, then Vinalhaven and St. George (both in coastal Knox County) are larger than Allagash).

Climate
This climatic region is typified by large seasonal temperature differences, with warm to hot (and often humid) summers and cold (sometimes severely cold) winters.  According to the Köppen Climate Classification system, Allagash has a humid continental climate, abbreviated "Dfb" on climate maps, bordering on a subarctic climate (Dfc).

Demographics

As of 2000 the median income for a household in the town was $18,125, and the median income for a family was $26,250. Males had a median income of $26,875 versus $17,813 for females. The per capita income for the town was $11,968.  About 15.1% of families and 18.8% of the population were below the poverty line, including 27.3% of those under the age of eighteen and 23.5% of those 65 or over.

2010 census
As of the census of 2010, there were 239 people, 124 households, and 76 families residing in the town. The racial makeup of the town was 97.5% White, 0.4% African American, and 2.1% from two or more races. Hispanic or Latino of any race were 0.8% of the population.

There were 124 households, of which 13.7% had children under the age of 18 living with them, 47.6% were married couples living together, 6.5% had a female householder with no husband present, 7.3% had a male householder with no wife present, and 38.7% were non-families. 35.5% of all households were made up of individuals, and 15.3% had someone living alone who was 65 years of age or older. The average household size was 1.93 and the average family size was 2.41.

The median age in the town was 57.8 years. 11.3% of residents were under the age of 18; 3% were between the ages of 18 and 24; 16.3% were from 25 to 44; 37.7% were from 45 to 64; and 31.8% were 65 years of age or older. The gender makeup of the town was 49.0% male and 51.0% female.

Notable people
 Troy Jackson, Maine Senate President
 Cathie Pelletier, novelist

References

Towns in Aroostook County, Maine
Allagash River
North Maine Woods
1886 establishments in Maine
Towns in Maine